Bidak-e Salar (also Romanized as Bīdak-e Sālār; also known as Bīdak-e ‘Olyā) is a village in Poshteh-ye Zilayi Rural District, Sarfaryab District, Charam County, Kohgiluyeh and Boyer-Ahmad Province, Iran. At the 2006 census, its population was 55, in 9 families.

References 

Populated places in Charam County